Javonte Perkins (born August 24, 1998) is an American college basketball player for the Saint Louis Billikens of the Atlantic 10 Conference (A-10). He previously played for the Southwestern Illinois Blue Storm.

High school career
Perkins attended Clyde C. Miller Career Academy in St. Louis, Missouri. He averaged 15.7 points, 9.5 rebounds, 3.6 assists and 3.0 steals per game as a junior, leading the team to a to a 21–5 record. As a senior, he averaged 20.8 points and 15.6 rebounds per game. Perkins competed for Gateway Basketball Club on the Amateur Athletic Union circuit.

College career
In his first two years of college basketball, Perkins played for Southwestern Illinois College. As a freshman, he averaged 20 points and 6.9 rebounds per game, shooting 60.5 percent from the floor. He averaged 26.4 points per game as a sophomore, which ranked third in the nation among junior college players. Perkins left as the program's all-time leading scorer. For his junior season, he committed to Saint Louis over two other NCAA Division I offers, including Louisiana–Monroe. After struggling initially, Perkins was given an expanded role during Atlantic 10 Conference play. In January 2020, he scored 25 points in consecutive games against Dayton and Davidson. On February 1, Perkins scored a season-high 33 points in a 78–73 win over Saint Joseph's. As a junior, he averaged 15 points and 3.5 rebounds per game, earning Third Team All-Atlantic 10 and Sixth Man of the Year honors. On November 28, Perkins posted 32 points, including 26 in the second half, and five assists in an 85–81 victory over LSU. As a senior during the 2020-2021 season he averaged 17.1 points and 3.9 rebounds per game. Perkins was named to the Second Team All-Atlantic 10. He missed the entire 2021-2022 season due to a torn ACL. Following the season, he announced he was taking advantage of the additional season of eligibility granted by the NCAA due to the COVID-19 pandemic and wil return for the 2022-2023 season as a redshirt graduate athlete.

Career statistics

College

NCAA Division I

|-
| style="text-align:left;"| 2019–20
| style="text-align:left;"| Saint Louis
| 31 || 1 || 27.3 || .443 || .351 || .768 || 3.5 || .7 || .8 || .3 || 15.0
|-
| style="text-align:left;"| 2020–21
| style="text-align:left;"| Saint Louis
| 21 || 21 || 30.5 || .465 || .376 || .866 || 3.9 || 1.8 || .7 || .5 || 17.1
|- class="sortbottom"
| style="text-align:center;" colspan="2"| Career
| 52 || 22 || 28.6 || .453 || .363 || .797 || 3.6 || 1.2 || .8 || .4 || 15.9

JUCO

|-
| style="text-align:left;"| 2017–18
| style="text-align:left;"| Southwestern Illinois
| 28 || 27 || — || .605 || .426 || .814 || 6.9 || 1.8 || 1.1 || .2 || 20.0
|-
| style="text-align:left;"| 2018–19
| style="text-align:left;"| Southwestern Illinois
| 27 || 27 || — || .537 || .360 || .797 || 7.9 || 2.7 || 1.1 || .4 || 26.4
|- class="sortbottom"
| style="text-align:center;" colspan="2"| Career
| 55 || 54 || — || .567 || .383 || .803 || 7.4 || 2.2 || 1.1 || .3 || 23.2

Personal life
Perkins' mother, Ilean Stokes, was diagnosed with multiple sclerosis in 2008. He is the youngest of three children. Older brother, Trevin Stokes, who passed October 2, 2020 at the age of 38 and older sister Djuana Ashford (32). He has 3 nieces Mercedes Stokes (10), Summer Stokes (1) and Skyy Stokes (1).

References

External links
Saint Louis Billikens bio

1998 births
Living people
American men's basketball players
Basketball players from St. Louis
Junior college men's basketball players in the United States
Saint Louis Billikens men's basketball players
Shooting guards
Small forwards
Southwestern Illinois College alumni